Snowblind or Snow Blind may refer to:

 Snow blindness or photokeratitis, a type of temporary eye damage caused by snow reflecting UV light

Film and television
 Snowblind (1921 film), an American film of 1921
 Snow Blind (film), a 2006 American documentary
 Snowblind (film), a 2010 American post-apocalyptic Western
 "Snowblind" (Teen Titans), a 2005 TV episode

Literature 
 Snowblind (book), a 1976 book by Robert Sabbag about cocaine smuggling
 Snowblind, a 2014 novel by Christopher Golden
 Snow Blind, a 2006 novel by P. J. Tracy

Songs
 "Snowblind" (Styx song), 1981
 "Snowblind", by the 77s from Drowning with Land in Sight, 1994
 "Snow Blind", by Ace Frehley from Ace Frehley, 1978
 "Snowblind", by Au5 featuring Tasha Baxter, 2014
 "Snowblind", by Black Sabbath from Vol. 4, 1972
 "Snowblind", by Judy Henske and Jerry Yester from Farewell Aldebaran, 1969
 "Snowblind", by Rob Thomas from Cradlesong, 2009
 "Snowblind", by Robbie Williams from Swings Both Ways, 2013
 "Snowblind", by Suede from Bloodsports, 2013
 "Snow Blind", by Susumu Hirasawa from Aurora, 1994
 "Snowblind", by Tori Amos from Night of Hunters, 2011

Video games
 Snowblind Studios, an American video game developer
 Snowblind Map Pack, an add-on for the video game Gears of War 2

See also 
 Project: Snowblind, a 2005 video game